Société Anonyme de Transport Aérien (SATA) alternatively known as Société Anonyme de Transport Aérien Genève, was a Swiss airline founded in June 1966, with its head office on the property of Geneva Airport, and with its base in Geneva. It started as an air-taxi operator and evolved to passenger and cargo charters to points in Europe, the USA, South America and the Caribbean. It terminated its activities in 1978.

Fleet 

SATA's fleet included these aircraft in 1978

 1 Cessna 172
 1 Cessna 421
 1 Pilatus PC-6
 2 Douglas DC-8
 3 Sud Aviation Caravelle

Incidents and accidents
SATA had two major incidents with its aircraft:
On July 17, 1973, while landing at Tromsø/Langnes Airport in Norway, a	Convair CV-640 landed heavily, bounced, and landed back nose-down, resting 15m short of the runway end. 
On December 18, 1977, SA de Transport Aérien Flight 730 a Sud Aviation SE-210 Caravelle 10R crashed into the sea while on final approach to Funchal Airport in Portugal, killing 36.

Literature 
 Charles Jacquat: Le goût du risque. Editions A. Barthelemy, Genf 1982.

References

External links
Aviation Safety Network
Le site des pionniers de l’aéronautique à Genève

 
Defunct airlines of Switzerland
Airlines established in 1966
Airlines disestablished in 1978
Swiss companies established in 1966
Swiss companies disestablished in 1978